Li Wenbo (born 9 December 1983 in Shenyang) is a former Chinese footballer who played as a defender.

Club career
Li Wenbo began his professional football career with Shenyang Ginde and made his league debut on 13 July 2003, in a 1–0 home defeat against Qingdao Beilaite. His second league appearance came at the beginning of the 2005 league season in the first game of the league campaign against Beijing Guoan on April 3, 2005 in a 1–1 draw. He established himself as regular within the team's defence and scored his first league goal against Shanghai Shenhua on October 23, 2005 in a 2–1 defeat. For the next several seasons was an important  member of the team and was part of the squad that moved to Changsha when the club renamed themselves Changsha Ginde.

By the 2010 Chinese Super League, Li was part of the team that were relegated at the end of the season. Throughout the league break there was much speculation about his future and it was expected that he would transfer to second tier club Shenyang Dongjin in February 2011. Li decided to stay with his club and was with them when the club moved to Guangzhou and renamed themselves Guangzhou R&F, which revived the club and they were promoted at the end of the 2011 China League One season.

In February 2014, Li transferred to fellow Super League club Shanghai Greenland Shenhua.

Li joined China League Two side Shenyang Dongjin in June 2018. On 23 June 2018, he made his debut in a 2–0 away defeat against Baotou Nanjiao. Li became a free player in July 2018 when Shenyang Dongjin failed to register for the rest of the season due to wage arrears.

Career statistics 
Statistics accurate as of match played 12 July 2018.

References

External links
Player profile at Sohu.com 
Player profile at Sodasoccer.com 

1983 births
Living people
Chinese footballers
Footballers from Shenyang
Changsha Ginde players
Guangzhou City F.C. players
Shanghai Shenhua F.C. players
Shenyang Dongjin players
Association football defenders
Chinese Super League players
China League One players